The 1914 County Championship was the 25th officially organised running of the County Championship, and began on 2 May 1914. Originally scheduled to run until 9 September, the last two matches of the season (both involving Surrey) were cancelled due to the outbreak of World War I.

With the final positions in the table being calculated by the percentage of possible points gained, Surrey were named champions for the seventh time.

Table
Five points were awarded for each win, three points were awarded to the team winning on first innings in a drawn match, and one point was awarded to the team losing on first innings in a drawn match. Defeats and abandonments scored no points.

Leading averages

See also
 1914 English cricket season

References

External links
1914 County Championship  at CricketArchive

1914 in English cricket
County Championship seasons
County